Hypebeast is a Hong Kong-listed company that focuses on contemporary culture and lifestyle. Originally founded in 2005 by Kevin Ma as a sneaker blog, over the years, Hypebeast has also expanded into other areas such as fashion, art, music, Web3, and more.

Hypebeast's three major divisions are Hypemedia, its online editorial and social media platforms; Hypemaker, an in-house creative production agency; and HBX, a retail platform. In addition to the Hypebeast media platform, which is in multiple languages, there are also Hypebae and Popbee for women, Hypemoon for Web3, Hypeart for art and Hypegolf for golf.

History 
Hypebeast was originally started as a sneaker blog in 2005 by Kevin Ma.
In 2012, the lifestyle, digital and streetwear focused site entered the retail sphere as HBX, selling fashion editor favourites.
In 2016, it launched its creative agency, Hypemaker.
In 2018, the company organized a festival called Hypefest in New York City.
In 2019, Hypebeast was transferred to the Main Board in the HKEX.
In 2020, Hypebeans, a café, was opened in the HBX Hong Kong store.
In 2022, the HBX New York flagship store was opened in Chinatown, New York.
In 2022, the Hypegolf Shop opened in Japan.

Recognition 
2008: Time magazine's 50 best websites
2017: Fast Company most innovative companies
2018: Forbes Asia 200 Best Under A Billion list

See also

References

External links 
Hypebeast website

Clothing companies of Hong Kong
Retail companies of Hong Kong
Entertainment companies of Hong Kong
Companies listed on the Hong Kong Stock Exchange
Online clothing retailers
Fashion websites
Fashion magazines
Sneaker culture
Street fashion
Hip hop fashion
Youth culture